Imperturbatia violescens is a species of air-breathing land snail, terrestrial pulmonate gastropod mollusk in the family Streptaxidae.

Gerlach & Bruggen (1999) have spelled the specific name as Imperturbatia violascens.

This species is endemic to the Seychelles.

References

Streptaxidae
Gastropods described in 1898
Taxonomy articles created by Polbot